Pterophorus niveus is a moth of the family Pterophoridae. It is found from Indonesia to the Solomon Islands and north to Luzon.

External links
Review of the Pterophoridae (Lepidoptera) from the Philippines

niveus
Moths described in 1903